Kansas and Missouri are two bordering U.S. states with a long and tumultuous history. The relationship between these two states has its roots in Bleeding Kansas, but mutual distrust has continued off and on since then, even in sporting contexts.

Missouri was formed out of the Missouri Territory as a slave state during the early 19th century. Northern states wanting to slow the westward spread of slavery hammered out the Missouri Compromise with southern states anxious to keep slavery legal; this compromise ensured that any state directly west of Missouri would be a free state where slavery would be illegal. Thirty-four years later, Kansas became a state. In 1854, Congress passed the Kansas–Nebraska Act that allowed the territory's residents to vote on whether or not slavery would be allowed. Both pro-slavery and anti-slavery boosters flooded into Kansas, but due to the state's proximity to Missouri, most were pro-slavery men from Missouri. They successfully stacked the vote to form a temporary pro-slavery government. Tensions resulting from this would lead to Bleeding Kansas, a violent and bloody civil war that would foreshadow the much larger American Civil War. Violence and guerrilla warfare continued for several years thereafter until the American Civil War ended, with many unjust killings and lootings performed by partisans on either side of the border. This violence and war deeply harmed the relationship between the two areas, even after Kansas attained statehood and the war had ended.

The two states, being neighbors, have to deal with each other regularly, but the bitterness sown during Bleeding Kansas lingers. To some extent, this is reflected in university athletics, as the Border War rivalry between the two states' main universities shows. The two states also compete economically.

References

History of Kansas
History of Missouri
Regional rivalries